Himeko is an uncommon Japanese feminine given name. It can have many different meanings depending on the kanji used. Possible meanings  are  "Princess child" and "Sun and rice child". It can also be written in hiragana or katakana.

Characters 
 Himeko Inaba, a main character in Kokoro Connect
 Himeko Kurusugawa, a main character in Kannazuki no Miko
 Himeko Katagiri, a character in Pani Poni
 Himeko Onizuka, a character in Sket Dance
 Himeko Shinohara, a character in Narcissu: Side 2nd
 Himeko Shirogane, a character in "Demashita! Powerpuff Girls Z"
 Himeko Murata, a character in Guns Girl School Day Z and Honkai Impact 3rd

See also 
 Himiko (queen)
 Legend of Himiko, an anime series, manga book, and PlayStation game. All three were released in early 1999

References 

Japanese feminine given names